Hibbertia laurana is a species of flowering plant in the family Dilleniaceae and is endemic to far northern Queensland. It is a shrub with hairy foliage, elliptic leaves, and yellow flowers, each with thirty to fifty stamens arranged in rows on one side of the two hairy carpels.

Description
The upper surface of the leaves is slightly shiny and the lower surface is covered with white hairs. There are thirty to fifty stamens fused at the base and arranged in rows on one side of the two hairy carpels, each carpel with two ovules.

Taxonomy
Hibbertia laurana was first formally described in 1991 by Sally T. Reynolds in the journal Austrobaileya from specimens collected near the Laura River in 1983. The specific epithet (laurana) refers to Laura where this species is common.

Distribution and habitat
This hibbertia usually grows among sandstone outcrops and is common near Laura in far north Queensland.

Conservation status
Hibbertia laurana is classified as of "least concern" under the Queensland Government Nature Conservation Act 1992.

See also
List of Hibbertia species

References

laurana
Flora of Queensland
Plants described in 1991